William Lawrence Mauldin (June 13, 1845 – August 13, 1912) was a South Carolina politician and railroad executive.  He served as mayor of Greenville, in the South Carolina House of Representatives, South Carolina Senate, and was Lieutenant Governor of South Carolina.  The University of North Carolina has a collection of his papers.

He was born in Greenville, South Carolina to Samuel and Caroline née McHardy Mauldin. He married Eliza Thompson Kern in 1871.

In 1877 he was elected mayor of Greenville. In 1882 he was elected to the South Carolina House of Representatives. In 1884 he became a member of the South Carolina Senate and in 1886 he became lieutenant governor. He was re-elected in 1888. After leaving office in 1890, he was elected again to the state house in 1898 with reelection in 1902, then to the state senate again in 1904, wherein he remained a senator until retiring after the session before his death.

Mauldin, South Carolina is named for him because he brought his railroad company through the village.

He served as lieutenant governor from December 1886 to December 1890.

See also
List of lieutenant governors of South Carolina
List of mayors of Greenville, South Carolina

References

External links
Findagrave entry

1845 births
1912 deaths
Lieutenant Governors of South Carolina
Mayors of Greenville, South Carolina
Members of the South Carolina House of Representatives
South Carolina state senators